The 2022–23 Old Dominion Monarchs men’s basketball team represented Old Dominion University in the 2022–23 NCAA Division I men's basketball season. The Monarchs, led by 10th-year head coach Jeff Jones, played their home games at Chartway Arena in Norfolk, Virginia as first-year members of the Sun Belt Conference.

Previous season
The Monarchs finished the 2021–22 season 13–19, 8–10 in C-USA play to finish in fifth place in the East division. They lost to UTEP in the second round of the C-USA tournament.

On October 27, 2021, Old Dominion announced that the season would be the last for the team in Conference USA and that they would join the Sun Belt Conference on July 1, 2022.

Offseason

Departures

Incoming transfers

Recruiting classes

2022 recruiting class

2023 recruiting class

Preseason

Preseason Sun Belt Conference poll 
Old Dominion was picked to finish ninth in the Sun Belt Conference Preseason Poll voted on by all 14 head coaches in the league.  The poll was released on October 17, 2022. No players were listed among the Sun Belt Conference Preseason Team.

Roster

Schedule and results 

|-
!colspan=12 style=| Exhibition

|-
!colspan=12 style=| Non-conference regular season

|-
!colspan=12 style=| Sun Belt Conference regular season

|-
!colspan=12 style=| Sun Belt tournament

Source

References
}}

Old Dominion Monarchs men's basketball seasons
Old Dominion Monarchs
Old Dominion Monarchs basketball
Old Dominion Monarchs basketball